General elections to the Cortes Generales were held in Spain between September and November 1939. At stake were all 241 seats in the Congress of Deputies.

Electoral system

Voting rights
Restricted census suffrage, only 376,255 people out of a total population of 12,162,872 were allowed to vote.

Constituencies
A majority voting system was used for the election, with 48 multi-member constituencies and 1 single-member constituency. Voting was secret and direct.

Results

References

 Estadísticas históricas de España: siglos XIX-XX.

1839
July 1839 events